Edward J. Zajac is James F. Beré Distinguished Professor of Management and Organizations at the Kellogg School of Management, Northwestern University.

In 2012 the Free University of Berlin gave him an honorary doctorate "for his pioneering work in the areas of corporate governance and strategic alliances".

Selected papers

References

External links
Vita

Northwestern University faculty
Year of birth missing (living people)
Living people
Place of birth missing (living people)
Wharton School of the University of Pennsylvania alumni
La Salle University alumni